"You Belong to Me" is a song written by American singer-songwriters Carly Simon and Michael McDonald. Originally recorded by McDonald's rock group The Doobie Brothers for their seventh studio album, Livin' on the Fault Line (1977), the song was made famous by Simon when she recorded it for her seventh studio album, Boys in the Trees (1978).  A live version of the song from The Doobie Brothers' 1983 album Farewell Tour would later chart on the Pop Singles chart at No. 79 in August 1983.

Overview
Released as the lead single from her seventh studio album, Boys in the Trees (1978), "You Belong to Me" reached the top ten of the Billboard Pop Singles chart, peaking at No. 6, and remained on the chart for 18 weeks. It also peaked at No. 4 on the Billboard Adult Contemporary chart. At the 21st Annual Grammy Awards in 1979, the track earned Simon a nomination for Best Female Pop Vocal Performance. Cash Box particularly praised the lead and backing vocals and "lilting sax solo." Record World said that it "blends [Simon's] style with [The Doobie Brothers]]' in a sultry, rather dream-like way, and some appropriate sax work adds to the effect."

One of Simon's biggest hits, "You Belong to Me" has been featured on many compilations of her work, including the three-disc box set Clouds in My Coffee (1995), the UK import The Very Best of Carly Simon: Nobody Does It Better (1998), the two-disc retrospective Anthology (2002), and the single-disc Reflections: Carly Simon's Greatest Hits (2004). It is also featured in Simon's 1987 HBO concert special Live from Martha's Vineyard, and the accompanying Greatest Hits Live (1988). The track is also featured in romantic comedy films Desperately Seeking Susan (1985) and Little Black Book (2004).

In 2009, Simon re-recorded the song, with guest vocalist John Forté, for her album of acoustic performances of many of her past hits, Never Been Gone.

Personnel 
 Carly Simon – lead vocals, backing vocals
 Richard Tee – Fender Rhodes
 Cornell Dupree – electric guitar
 Eric Gale – electric guitar
 Gordon Edwards – bass
 Steve Gadd – drums
 David Sanborn – alto saxophone solo
 James Taylor – backing vocals
 Jonathan Abramowitz, Lamar Alsop, Julien Barber, Alfred Brown, Fredrick Buldrini, Paul Gershman, Ted Hoyle, Theodore Israel, Harold Kohon, Jesse Levy, Charles Libove, Guy Lumia, Joe Malin, Yoko Matsuo, Homer Mensch, Kermit Moore, Marvin Morgenstern, Alan Shulman, Mitsue Takayama and Gerald Tarack – strings

Track listing
7" single 
 "You Belong to Me" – 3:12
 "In A Small Moment" – 3:05

Chart performance

Awards

The Doobie Brothers version
"You Belong to Me" originally appeared on The Doobie Brothers' seventh studio album, Livin' on the Fault Line (1977). The live version from their 1983 album Farewell Tour would later chart on the Pop Singles chart at No. 79 in August 1983.

Chart performance

Anita Baker version

In 1994, American R&B/soul singer Anita Baker re-recorded her own version of the song for the compilation album Rubáiyát: Elektra's 40th Anniversary in 1990. She subsequently re-released   the track in 1995 as the fourth single from her fifth studio album, Rhythm of Love.

Other covers
Artists who have covered the song include:

Jennifer Lopez on her 2002 album This Is Me... Then.
Chaka Khan on her 2007 album Funk This, as a collaboration with Michael McDonald. 
It was recorded in Finnish by Finnish singer Maarit for her 1978 album Siivet saan, retitled "Yhteen kuulutaan". 
Los Hooligans, a traditional ska band from Fresno, California, covered the song on their Mafioso Ska CD released in 2006 with lead vocals sung by Randy Young.

References

External links
 Carly Simon's Official Website
 Michael McDonald's Official Website
 

1977 songs
1978 singles
Carly Simon songs
The Doobie Brothers songs
Elektra Records singles
Songs written by Carly Simon
Songs written by Michael McDonald (musician)
Song recordings produced by Arif Mardin
Song recordings produced by Michael J. Powell